Oxypteron is a Palearctic genus of moths belonging to the subfamily Tortricinae of the family Tortricidae.

Species
Oxypteron algerianum Razowski, 1965 Algeria
Oxypteron eremica (Walsingham, 1907) Algeria
Oxypteron exiguana (Laharpe, 1860) Sicily, Southwest Europe
Oxypteron homsana Amsel, 1954 Syria
Oxypteron impar Staudinger, 1871 SudRussland, Transkaspasien
Oxypteron kruegeri (Turati, 1924) Cyrenaica (Libya)
Oxypteron palmoni (Amsel, 1940) Palestine
Oxypteron polita (Walsingham, 1907) Southwest Europe
Oxypteron schawerdai (Rebel, 1936) Southwest Europe
Oxypteron wertheimsteini (Rebel, in Rothschild, 1913) Hungary

See also
List of Tortricidae genera

References

External links
tortricidae.com

Tortricidae genera